Phil Garthwaite (born October 6, 1972) is a Democratic former member of the Wisconsin State Assembly, representing the 49th Assembly District from 2006 until his defeat in 2010. He was a member of the Committees on Agriculture, Transportation, Rural Affairs, and Rural Economic Development and the Council on Highway Safety.

Garthwaite attended UW-River Falls. He is a graduate of Continental Auctioneers University in Mankato, MN and Madison Media Institute. He is a former radio director and on-air personality. He is also a farmer manager and member of the National Association of Farm Broadcasting and the National Dairy Shrine.

He was defeated for re-election by Travis Tranel in 2010.

Education
Phil Garthwaite has received his education from the following institutions:
Graduated, Madison Media Institute, 1999
Attended, Agricultural Communications, University of Wisconsin, River Falls 1991-1995
Graduated, Continental Auctioneers University, Mankato, Montana, 1993

Political Experience
Phil Garthwaite has had the following political experience:
Candidate, Wisconsin Assembly, District 49, 2010
Assembly Member, Wisconsin State Assembly, 2006–2010

Professional Experience
Phil Garthwaite has had the following professional experience:
Farm Manager
Farm Radio Broadcaster/Director

References

External links
Wisconsin Assembly - Representative Phil Garthwaite official government website
Phil Garthwaite for State Assembly official campaign website
 
 Follow the Money - Phil Garthwaite
2008 2006 campaign contributions
Campaign 2008 campaign contributions at Wisconsin Democracy Campaign

1972 births
Living people
People from Lancaster, Wisconsin
University of Wisconsin–River Falls alumni
21st-century American politicians
Democratic Party members of the Wisconsin State Assembly